Tuloma may refer to:
Tuloma (river), a river in Murmansk Oblast, Russia
Tuloma (rural locality), a rural locality (a selo) in Murmansk Oblast, Russia